John Merrick (1756–1829) was the architect who designed St. George's Round Church and Province House (Nova Scotia), where his portrait is mounted.

References 

1756 births
1829 deaths
History of Nova Scotia